Jadamba Narantungalag (born December 16, 1975) is a Mongolian professional mixed martial artist, kickboxer and grappler who has fought for World Victory Road, K-1 MAX, Legend FC, Art of War Fighting Championship, and ONE Championship.

Narantungalag has fought the likes of Masato, Buakaw Banchamek,  and Albert Kraus in K-1 kickboxing.

Background
He first began Judo as a child, before moving to kyokushin as a teenager. He began training mixed martial arts, kickboxing, and Brazilian jiujitsu when he moved to Japan.

Mixed martial arts career
Narantungalag had a slow start to his mixed martial arts career, losing his first two professional bouts to UFC veteran Norifumi Yamamoto in 2004, and Toshikazu Iseno in 2006, via KO and unanimous decision respectively. Following this though, he would go on a four fight winning streak, and also won the Mongolian MMA Championship Tournament in 2010, defeating both Burenzorig Batmunkh and Otgonbaatar Nergui via submission. After the impressive victories, Narantungalag signed with upstart promotion Sengoku Raiden Championship.

World Victory Road
After signing with the promotion, Narantungalag faced Pride FC and UFC veteran Akihiro Gono at WVR: Sengoku Raiden Championships 14 on August 22, 2010. He won the fight by unanimous decision.

In his second fight with the promotion, Narantungalag faced Kazunori Yokota at WVR: Soul of Fight in the promotion's final event on December 30, 2010. He won the fight via first-round knockout, bringing his winning streak to six in a row.

Legend Fighting Championship
Narantungalag faced Adrian Pang at Legend FC 6 on October 30, 2011, for the LFC Lightweight Championship. He won the fight via split decision.

In his first title defense within the promotion, Narantungalag faced Korean prospect Yui Chul Nam at Legend FC 8 on March 30, 2012. He successfully retained the championship, winning the fight via second round guillotine choke.

For his next fight in the promotion, Narantungalag faced Koji Ando at Legend FC 11 on April 27, 2013. He would lose the championship bout in the third round, after suffering a broken ankle.

ONE Championship
In April 2014, Narantungalag signed with Singapore based promotion ONE Championship. He made his debut against the former ONE Featherweight Champion, Honorio Banario at ONE FC: Honor and Glory on May 30, 2014. After three rounds, Narantungalag would win the fight via unanimous decision, handing Banario his third straight loss.

Narantungalag faced Koji Oishi for the ONE Featherweight Championship at ONE FC 19: Reign of Champions on August 29, 2014. He won the fight by unanimous decision to become the new ONE Featherweight champion.

Narantungalag was set to defend his title for the first time against Eric Kelly at ONE FC 23. ONE FC & Kelly's management team could not see eye-to-eye and the negotiations fell through. Narantungalag was then set to defend his title against the undefeated Russian Marat Gafurov at ONE FC 31 but visa trouble but a halt to that and Gafurov then fought Martin Nguyen for the interim ONE Featherweight Championship .

Narantungalag and Gafurov finally met at ONE FC 34 to unify the ONE Featherweight Championship. He lost via rear-naked choke in the fourth round.

In his first fight of 2016, Narantungalag was set to face former ONE Lightweight Champion Kotetsu Boku at ONE 42. He won via Von Flue choke in the third round.

He returned in July of the same year to KO Eric Kelly, before losing to Gafurov in their rematch in November.

Following a forced hiatus due to injury, Jadambaa returned in 2018 and picked up back-to-back victories over Edward Kelly and Kazuki Tokudome.

These victories earned him another shot at the ONE Featherweight Championship against Martin Nguyen at ONE: Roots of Honor. Jadambaa lost by first-round knockout via flying knee.

Championships and Accomplishments
Fight Matrix
2010 Most Lopsided Upset of The Year vs. Akihiro Gono on August 22
Legend Fighting Championship
Legend FC Lightweight Championship (One time)
One successful title defense
Mongolian MMA Championship
2010 MGL Mongolian MMA Championship Tournament Winner
ONE Championship
ONE Featherweight Championship (One time)

Kickboxing record

|-  bgcolor="#CCFFCC"
| 2009-06-27 || Win ||align=left| U.Ganthmuru || MGL-1 70 kg Tournament Final || Ulan Bator, Mongolia || KO || 1 ||      || 4-6
|-
! style=background:white colspan=9 |
|-  bgcolor="#CCFFCC"
| 2009-06-27 || Win ||align=left| D.Byanbadoruji || MGL-1 70 kg Tournament Semi Finals || Ulan Bator, Mongolia || KO || 2 ||      || 3-6
|-  bgcolor="#CCFFCC"
| 2009-06-27 || Win ||align=left| B.Tosynthestugs || MGL-1 70 kg Tournament Quarter Finals || Ulan Bator, Mongolia || KO || 2 ||      || 2-6
|-  bgcolor="#FFBBBB"
| 2007-04-04 || Loss ||align=left| Tsogto Amara || K-1 World MAX 2007 World Championship Final || Tokyo, Japan || Ext. R Decision (Unanimous) || 4 || 3:00 || 1-6
|-  bgcolor="#FFBBBB"
| 2005-11-25 || Loss ||align=left| Andy Souwer || Shootboxing: 20th Anniversary Series Final || Tokyo, Japan || Decision (Unanimous) || 5 || 3:00 || 1-5
|-  bgcolor="#FFBBBB"
| 2005-07-20 || Loss ||align=left| Buakaw Por. Pramuk || K-1 World MAX 2005 Championship Final, Quarter Finals || Yokohama, Japan || Decision (Majority) || 3 || 3:00 || 1-4
|-  bgcolor="#CCFFCC"
| 2005-05-04 || Win ||align=left| Yasuhiro Kazuya || K-1 World MAX 2005 World Tournament Open || Tokyo, Japan || Decision (Majority) || 3 || 3:00 || 1-3
|-  bgcolor="#FFBBBB"
| 2004-07-07 || Loss ||align=left| Masato || K-1 World MAX 2004 World Tournament Final, Quarter Finals || Tokyo, Japan || Decision (Unanimous) || 3 || 3:00 || 0-3
|-  bgcolor="#FFBBBB"
| 2004-04-07 || Loss ||align=left| Albert Kraus || K-1 World MAX 2004 World Tournament Open || Tokyo, Japan || Ext.R Decision (Unanimous) || 4 || 3:00 || 0-2
|-  bgcolor="#FFBBBB"
| 2003-11-03 || Loss ||align=left| Tomo || New Japan Wrestling Championship-YOKOHAMA DEAD OUT || Yokohama, Japan || KO (Left Hook) || 2 || 1:58 || 0-1
|-

Mixed martial arts record

|-
| Loss
| align=center| 14–6
| Martin Nguyen
| KO (flying knee)
| ONE Championship: Roots of Honor
| 
| align=center| 2
| align=center| 1:07
| Manila, Philippines
| 
|-
| Win
| align=center| 14–5
| Kazuki Tokudome
| Decision (unanimous) 
| ONE Championship: Pursuit of Power
| 
| align=center| 3
| align=center| 5:00
| Kuala Lumpur, Malaysia
| 
|-
| Win
| align=center| 13–5
| Edward Kelly
| TKO (punch) 
| ONE Championship: Pinnacle of Power
| 
| align=center| 2
| align=center| 4:58
| Macau, SAR, China
| 
|-
| Loss
| align=center| 12–5
| Marat Gafurov
| Technical Submission (rear-naked choke)
| ONE Championship: Defending Honor
| 
| align=center| 1
| align=center| 4:51
| Kallang, Singapore
| 
|-
|-
| Win
| align=center| 12–4
| Eric Kelly
| KO (punch)
| ONE Championship: Dynasty of Champions (Anhui)
| 
| align=center| 1
| align=center| 0:44
| Anhui, China
|
|-
| Win
| align=center| 11–4
| Kotetsu Boku
| Submission (von flue choke)
| ONE Championship: Ascent To Power
| 
| align=center| 3
| align=center| 1:27
| Kallang, Singapore
|
|-
| Loss
| align=center| 10–4
| Marat Gafurov
| Submission (rear naked choke)
| ONE FC: Dynasty of Champions (Beijing II)
| 
| align=center| 4
| align=center| 4:39
| Beijing, China
| 
|-
| Win
| align=center| 10–3
| Koji Oishi
| Decision (unanimous)
| ONE FC: Reign of Champions
| 
| align=center| 5
| align=center| 5:00
| Dubai, UAE
| 
|-
| Win
| align=center| 9–3
| Honorio Banario
| Decision (unanimous)
| ONE FC: Honor and Glory
| 
| align=center| 3
| align=center| 5:00
| Kallang, Singapore
| 
|-
| Loss
| align=center| 8–3
| Koji Ando
| TKO (ankle injury)
| Legend Fighting Championship 11
| 
| align=center| 3
| align=center| 0:47
| Kuala Lumpur, Malaysia
| 
|-
| Win
| align=center| 8–2
| Yui Chul Nam
| Submission (guillotine choke)
| Legend Fighting Championship 8
| 
| align=center| 2
| align=center| 0:58
| Hong Kong, SAR, China
| 
|-
| Win
| align=center| 7–2
| Adrian Pang 
| Decision (split)
| Legend Fighting Championship 6
| 
| align=center| 3
| align=center| 5:00
| Macau, SAR, China
| 
|-
| Win
| align=center| 6–2
| Kazunori Yokota
| KO (punch)
| World Victory Road Presents: Soul of Fight
| 
| align=center| 1
| align=center| 2:03
| Tokyo, Japan
| 
|-
| Win
| align=center| 5–2
| Akihiro Gono
| Decision (unanimous)
| World Victory Road Presents: Sengoku Raiden Championships 14
| 
| align=center| 3
| align=center| 5:00
| Tokyo, Japan
| 
|-
| Win
| align=center| 4–2
| Otgonbaatar Nergui
| Submission (rear-naked choke)
| MGL-1 - 2010 Mongolian MMA Championship
| 
| align=center| 1
| align=center| 3:57
| Ulan Bator, Mongolia
| 
|-
| Win
| align=center| 3–2
| Burenzorig Batmunkh
| Submission (armbar)
| MGL-1 - 2010 Mongolian MMA Championship
| 
| align=center| 1
| align=center| 4:19
| Ulan Bator, Mongolia
| 
|-
| Win
| align=center| 2–2
| Berneung Topkingboxing
| Submission (armbar)
| AOW 13: Rising Force 	
| 
| align=center| 1
| align=center| 2:28
| Beijing, China
| 
|-
| Win
| align=center| 1–2
| Wataru Miki
| Decision (unanimous)
| Imperial	 	
| 
| align=center| 3
| align=center| 5:00
| Ulan Bator, Mongolia
| 
|-
| Loss
| align=center| 0–2
| Toshikazu Iseno
| Decision (unanimous)  	
| Kokoro: Kill Or Be Killed 	
| 
| align=center| 3
| align=center| 5:00
| Tokyo, Japan
| 
|-
| Loss
| align=center| 0–1
| Norifumi Yamamoto
| KO (punch)
| K-1 World MAX 2004 Champions' Challenge	 	
| 
| align=center| 1
| align=center| 1:55
| Tokyo, Japan
|

See also
 List of male mixed martial artists

References

External links
 Official Homepage

1975 births
Living people
Mongolian male mixed martial artists
Lightweight mixed martial artists
Mongolian male kickboxers
Welterweight kickboxers
Mongolian male judoka
Mongolian male karateka
Mongolian practitioners of Brazilian jiu-jitsu
Mixed martial artists utilizing Bökh
Mixed martial artists utilizing judo
Mixed martial artists utilizing Kyokushin kaikan
Mixed martial artists utilizing shootboxing
Mixed martial artists utilizing Brazilian jiu-jitsu
People from Bulgan Province
Mongolian expatriate sportspeople in Japan
Featherweight mixed martial artists
ONE Championship champions